The Big Ten Conference began sponsoring women's basketball during the 1982–83 basketball season. In February 1982 during the 1981–82 season, the conference held a tournament at Michigan State in which Ohio State defeated Illinois 69–66 in the championship game. The conference has listed this in some publications as a regular season championship.

Championships by school 

Bold indicates an outright championship.

See also 
 Big Ten Conference men's basketball regular season champions
 Big Ten Conference men's basketball tournament
 Big Ten Conference women's basketball tournament

Champions